Rotheca serrata, commonly known as the blue fountain bush, the blue-flowered glory tree or the  beetle killer, is a species of flowering plants in the family Lamiaceae. It is native to India, Sri Lanka and Malaysia.

Description
The squarish stems are only sparsely branched. The young growth is glabrous and the leaves are in opposite pairs or develop with three at a node. They are oval, serrated and hairless with an acute base and a stout petiole. The flowers are showy and develop in cymes which are covered with short, soft erect hairs. The corolla of each flower is blue, cylindrical, hairless outside and hairy inside and the stamens arch out from it. The four upper lobes are flat and spreading while the lowest lobe forms a concave lip. The fruit is a four-lobed fleshy drupe, green at first and black when ripe.

Distribution
Rotheca serrata is native to eastern India, Sri Lanka and Malaysia and is found in forests.

Uses
The plant is also used in Ayurveda for snake bites.

Common names
Hindi - Bharangi (भरंगी) 
Manipuri - Moirang khanam (মোইরাংগ খানম) 
Marathi - Bharangi (भरंगी) 
Tamil - Sirutekku (சிறு தேக்கு) 
Malayalam - Cherutekku 
Telugu - Gantubarangi 
Kannada - Gantabarangi 
Gujarati - Bharangi (भरंगी)

References

External links
 

Lamiaceae
Flora of China
Flora of tropical Asia